R-phrases (short for risk phrases) are defined in Annex III of European Union Directive 67/548/EEC: Nature of special risks attributed to dangerous substances and preparations. The list was consolidated and republished in Directive 2001/59/EC, where translations into other EU languages may be found.

These risk phrases are used internationally, not just in Europe, and there is an ongoing effort towards complete international harmonization using the Globally Harmonized System of Classification and Labelling of Chemicals (GHS) which now generally replaces these risk phrases.

Risk phrases
Missing R-numbers indicate phrases that have been deleted or replaced by other phrases.

Combinations

R-phrases no longer in use
 R13: Extremely flammable liquefied gas.
 R47: May cause birth defects.

See also 
 List of S-phrases
 Material safety data sheet
 Risk and Safety Statements

References

External links 
 Chemical Risk & Safety Phrases. in 23 European Languages

Occupational safety and health
International standards
Safety codes